Vince Genna Stadium is a baseball park in the northwest United States, located in Bend, Oregon. Opened  in 1964, it currently hosts college summer baseball league and area American Legion games.

Originally known as "Municipal Ball Park", it was renamed  in June 1972 for Vince Genna (1921–2007), the director of the city's parks & recreation department and former American Legion coach. When minor league baseball returned in 1978 with the Timber Hawks, Genna was an honorary first base coach in their debut game.

The stadium was the longtime home of Bend's minor league teams in the Class A-Short Season Northwest League, and later the Bend Bandits of the Western Baseball League. It is currently the home of the Bend Elks in the collegiate summer West Coast League and has a seating capacity of approximately 3,500.

In 1978, the Timber Hawks had intermissions called "sun breaks" near sundown when the glare was excessive. The Angels cited the need for adequate sun screens in left field (west) as one of the reasons for breaking their affiliation with the Bend Bucks after the 1989 season.

The stadium has hosted affiliates of four major-league teams (Angels, A's, Phillies, and Rockies), four players who made the majors (Brian Barden, Julio Franco, Jacoby Ellsbury, and Eric Sogard), and one future movie star (Kurt Russell played for the Bend Rainbows in 1971).

In 1979, the Central Oregon Phillies paid the Bend Metro Park and Recreation District $9,500 for use of the ballpark for the season. In 1980, the team paid $9,700. In 2008, the Bend Elks led the WCL in league and overall attendance, averaging 1,430 fans at Genna Stadium over 21 league home games. In 2010 Genna Stadium continued to lead the WCL in total and league attendance, along with average game attendance; its record-setting season attendance exceeded 50,000.

Northwest League records
Short-season Class A

^ The Rainbows were an affiliate of the Hawaii Islanders of the Triple-A Pacific Coast League;   the Islanders' parent clubs were the California Angels (1970), and the San Diego Padres (1971)

Former players
Bend Bandits players   (1995–1998) 
Bend Rockies players   (1992–1994)
Bend Bucks players   (1987–1991)
Bend Phillies players   (1981–1986)
Central Oregon Phillies players   (1979–1980)
Bend Timber Hawks players   (1978)
Bend Rainbows players   (1970–1971)

References

External links
Bend Parks and Recreation: – Genna Stadium
Bend Elks: – Vince Genna Stadium
Baseball Reference: – Vince Genna Stadium
Municipal Stadium

Baseball venues in Oregon
Minor league baseball venues
Buildings and structures in Bend, Oregon
1964 establishments in Oregon
Sports in Bend, Oregon
Sports venues completed in 1964